Carbonyl cyanide m-chlorophenyl hydrazone (CCCP; also known as [(3-chlorophenyl)hydrazono]malononitrile) is a chemical inhibitor of oxidative phosphorylation. It is a nitrile, hydrazone and protonophore. In general, CCCP causes the gradual destruction of living cells and death of the organism, although mild doses inducing partial decoupling have been shown to increase median and maximum lifespan in C. elegans models, suggesting a degree of hormesis. CCCP causes an uncoupling of the proton gradient that is established during the normal activity of electron carriers in the electron transport chain. The chemical acts essentially as an ionophore and reduces the ability of ATP synthase to function optimally. It is routinely used as an experimental uncoupling agent in cell and molecular biology, particularly in the study of mitophagy, where it was integral in discovering the role of the Parkinson's disease-associated ubiquitin ligase Parkin. Outside of its effects on mitochondria, CCCP may also disrupt lysosomal degradation during autophagy.

See also 
Carbonyl cyanide-p-trifluoromethoxyphenylhydrazone (FCCP)

References

Nitriles
Hydrazones
Chlorobenzenes
Ionophores
Uncoupling agents